The 2015–16 Liga III is the 60th season of the Liga III, the third tier of the Romanian football league system.  The season began on 28 August.

Teams
At the end of 2014-15 season, Bucovina Pojorâta (Seria I), Dunărea Călărași (Seria II), Chindia Târgoviște, (Seria III), UTA Arad (Seria IV) and FCM Baia Mare (Seria V)  promoted to Liga II.Nine teams were relegated to Liga IV: Ceahlăul II Piatra Neamț and FC Păpăuți (Seria I), Viitorul Axintele and Oțelul II Galați (Seria II), Muscelul Câmpulung and Astra II (Seria III), Minerul Valea Copcii (Seria IV), Gloria Bistrița and Unirea Dej (Seria V).Last four teams from 2014–15 Liga II were relegated to Liga III: Unirea Slobozia and Săgeata Năvodari (Seria I), Olt Slatina and Fortuna Poiana Câmpina (Seria II).The winners of the Liga IV Promotion Play-Offs were promoted to Liga III:  Performanța Ighiu, FC Aninoasa, Luceafărul Oradea, Înfrățirea Hărman, Olimpia Râmnicu Sărat, CSM Oltenița, Viitorul II Constanța, AFC Odorheiu Secuiesc, Cetate Deva, Voluntari II, Comuna Recea, CS Universitatea II Craiova, Speranța Răucești, Sporting Turnu Măgurele, Petrolistul Boldești, Luceafărul Bălan, Inter Dorohoi, ASU Politehnica Timișoara, Atletico Vaslui, Măgura Cisnădie and CS Panciu.

After the end of the last season, Săgeata Năvodari, Fortuna Poiana Câmpina, CSC Sânmartin and Olt Slatina were dissolved.

FCM Târgoviște, Metropolitan Ișalnița, Speranța Răucești, Știința Turceni and CS Vișina Nouă did not enter in the competition.

Arieșul Turda was excluded for unpaid debts.

Muscelul Câmpulung and Unirea Dej were spared from relegation.

Renamed teams

Argeșul Pitești was renamed SCM Pitești.

Înfrățirea Hărman was renamed AFC Hărman.

Viitorul Craiova was moved to Ișalnița and renamed Metropolitan Ișalnița.

Vulturii Lugoj was renamed CSM Lugoj.

Inter Clinceni was moved from Clinceni to Slatina and was renamed as Inter Olt Slatina.

Kosarom Pașcani was renamed as CSM Pașcani.

Vulturii Lugoj was renamed as CSM Lugoj.

League tables

Seria I

Seria II

Seria III

Seria IV

Seria V

References

2015
3
Romania